The 2017 season is the 107th season of competitive football in Paraguay.

Primera División

División Intermedia

 Promotoed as Winners: 3 de Febrero
 Promoted as Runners Up: Deportivo Santaní
 Relegated: Deportivo Caacupé
 Relegated: Olimpia Itá

Tercera División

Primera División B Metropolitana

 Promoted as Winners: Sportivo San Lorenzo
 Promotion Play-off: Colegiales
 Relegated: Benjamín Aceval
 Relegated: Cerro Corá

Primera División B Nacional

 Promoted as Winners: 2 de Mayo
 Promotion Play-off: R.I 3 Corrales

Promotion play-off
 Colegiales 3–3 R.I 3 Corrales on aggregate. Corrales won 4–2 on penalties.

Cuarta División

Transfers

 List of transfers during the 2017 season registered under the Asociación Paraguaya de Fútbol.

References

 
Seasons in Paraguayan football